The Georgetown Journal of International Affairs is a biannual peer-reviewed academic journal covering international affairs. It is published by the Johns Hopkins University Press on behalf of the Walsh School of Foreign Service. The journal publishes articles from a wide range of international and interdisciplinary perspectives. The journal was established in 2000 and is indexed in Columbia International Affairs Online, ProQuest databases, Hein Online, Thomson Gale, and the Public Affairs Information Service. The print edition is published annually.

Organization
The organization has eight editorial sections (Conflict & Security, Global Governance, Human Rights & Development, Business & Economics, Science & Technology, Society & Culture, Dialogues, and Student Review). The editors-in-chief of the online edition are Zara Ali and Jenna Galberg. The editors-in-chief of the print edition are Daria Farman-Farmaian and Mikael Pir-Budagyan. The organization also contains a development section, composed of two co-executive directors, Gwyneth Murphey and Judy Jiang, and other directors who work the logistics of the journal.

Notable alumni

Ned Price, current Spokesperson for the U.S. Department of State and former Special Assistant to President Barack Obama
Parag Khanna, specialist in international relations and managing partner of FutureMap

References

External links
 

Magazines published in Washington, D.C.
Johns Hopkins University Press academic journals
Political magazines published in the United States
Magazines established in 2000
English-language magazines